GuJian2 is a 3D role-playing video game developed by Aurogon with the Vision engine and published by Gamebar. The second main entry of the Gujian series, it was originally released in China on August 18, 2013 for Microsoft Windows. A sequel, Gujian3, was released in 2018.

Setting
A calamity befalls the world  With the immortal tree Ju Mu as a base, the Shen Nong tribe reconstructs Liu Yue City, guiding the immortals to construct the five-colored stones and hand it over to Nuwa in order to repair the pillar of heaven.
However, due to the long period of time needed, death and casualty were aplenty. There exists a tribe named "Lie Shan", who possesses psychic power. The people of the tribe entered Liu Yue City and assisted the Shen Nong. Touched by their sincerity, the Shen Nong therefore inserted a drop of their immortal blood into Gui Mu, causing the tree to blossom with the power of life; therefore allowing the people of Lie Shan to survive without food or water.

The process of repairing the heavens was difficult. The heaven's emperor Fu Yi then uses the immortal Zhao Ming sword, heading toward the Eastern Seas to kill the Ju Ao (a great turtle) and uses its legs to set them up as the four pillars. The azure sky was patched; the four pillars were set up; the surging waters were drained. However in the process, the Zhao Ming sword was destroyed. After the disaster, foul air filled the mortal realm, and people slowly began to die of illness. However, Liu Yue City was situated within the Nine Heavens, and therefore was not affected much by the foul air. The Shen Nong and Lie Shan tribe stayed within the city while looking for other suitable places to reside in. Slowly, Liu Yue City was left a barren land. The Lie Shan tribe therefore construed the Temple of Wei'e, praying every day for the immortals to return.

Characters

Key characters

Gameplay
Players control the main characters as they travel around ancient China and complete missions. The game has a main storyline and side quests, which objectives are usually for players to obtain certain items, travel to specific areas or kill monsters. The main quests allow the player to proceed onto the next stage and continue with the storyline, while the side quests serve mainly to give insights to the history and personality of non-player characters and provide information about skills. Players interact with notice boards in villages to accept missions, collect points and compete in the rankings.

When players engage in a battle, they are taken to a separate combat screen and stand face-to-face. The screen will show their various skills and gallery of items; as well as specific traits of the boss. They are able to gain combat experience and raise their character's level, or gain extra rewards during a "perfect battle". A new feature of this game is that the players can switch characters in the middle of the battle, or use items to control their character. Players can also change strategies to influence their inactive characters, which are controlled by artificial intelligence.

The weapons inside the game have experience values. Combined with specific items, the level of the weapon can be raised. Magic stones can be collected throughout the game to increase the weapons' value or alter their visual appearance; as well as be used for recovery attack. Players can collect recipes and cook food, or if failed, achieve a special effect or item. In the game, each player has a piece of land which is their "home", where they can plant items as well as decorate with furniture. Players can also dig for treasures which serve as additional elements of storytelling.

Adaptations

Film
A film adaptation titled Legend of the Ancient Sword and produced by Alibaba Pictures and directed by Renny Harlin was released in October 2018. It stars Taiwanese singer Leehom Wang, Victoria Song, Godfrey Gao, Karena Ng and Archie Kao.

Television
The game has been adapted into a drama series, starring Fu Xinbo, Ying Er and Aarif Lee, which aired in July 2018.

References

Video games adapted into films
Video games adapted into television shows
Swords of Legends
Video games based on Chinese mythology
Single-player video games
Windows games
Windows-only games
2013 video games
Soft-World games